Barton in Fabis is a civil parish in the Rushcliffe district of Nottinghamshire, England.  The parish contains seven listed buildings that are recorded in the National Heritage List for England.   Of these, one is listed at Grade I, the highest of the three grades, and the others are at Grade II, the lowest grade.   The parish contains the village of Barton in Fabis and the surrounding countryside.  All the listed buildings are in the village, and consist of a church and associated structures, including a war memorial, a rectory, an octagonal dovecote, and two houses.


Key

Buildings

References

Citations

Sources

 

Lists of listed buildings in Nottinghamshire